Mike Cerino is the head coach of the Charlotte Hounds of Major League Lacrosse.

References

Year of birth missing (living people)
Living people
Major League Lacrosse coaches
Place of birth missing (living people)